The Women's 1500m freestyle event at the 2010 South American Games was held on March 29 at 18:00.

Medalists

Records

Results

Final

References
Final

Freestyle 1500m W